The 2001–02 Marquette Golden Eagles men's basketball team represented the Marquette University in the 2001–02 season. Their head coach was Tom Crean. They received the conference's automatic bid to the NCAA Tournament where they lost in the first round to Tulsa.

Roster

Schedule and results

|-
!colspan=9 style=| Conference USA tournament

|-
!colspan=9 style=| NCAA tournament

Rankings

References 

Marquette
Marquette Golden Eagles men's basketball seasons
Marquette
Marquette
Marquette